One Little Plane is folk artist Kathryn Bint. Hailing from Chicago, Bint's music has been described as "gently wistful, dust-kicking psychedelia" and "dreamy heart warming folk" with "simple, heartfelt melodies". One Little Plane's debut album, Until (2008), featured production from Kieran Hebden. Hebden also produced the follow-up, Into the Trees (2012).

Discography

Albums
 Until (2008)
 Into the Trees (2012)

Singles
 "She Was Out in the Water" (2012)

References

External links
One Little Plane on Myspace

American women singers
American folk musicians
Living people
Singers from Chicago
Year of birth missing (living people)
21st-century American women